The Heaven and Earth Show is a BBC television programme that aired on Sunday mornings from 10am to 11am on BBC One. The show ran for nine years between 1998 and 2007, looking at spiritual and moral issues. Over the years it had numerous presenters, and its final presenter was Gloria Hunniford.

Format
The programme had a magazine format, with guests of all backgrounds talking about various ethical, spiritual and cultural issues. The programme also featured phone-ins, email and text readouts. Commonly a celebrity guest would be interviewed about their career with a particular focus on religious belief or spirituality; some later guests included Jermaine Jackson, Al Green, Alexei Sayle and Vic Reeves. Heaven and Earth was notably different from traditional "God slot" (Sunday morning/afternoon) programming in that it concentrated on a wide range of beliefs rather than just Christianity – for example, features on the ethics of halal meat or "New Age" concepts of spirituality. It included prominent figures from the Church and Islamic, Jewish, Hindu and secular communities and would also contain reports on topical religious issues, with notable reporters including Toyah Willcox, John Walters, Ed Stourton, Myleene Klass, Kate Silverton and Kate Gerbeau.

Occasionally there were special programmes such as that on 7 September 2003 covering three different types of beliefs: theist, New Age followers and atheists or agnostics. A specially commissioned poll was produced on issues raised.

Productions
Heaven and Earth was made by the BBC's in-house Religion and Ethics department and was broadcast live from a former news studio at the BBC in Oxford Road, Manchester. Later on, as part of a re-launch, the show moved to ITV's Granada Studios.

Cancellation
The BBC announced in the spring of 2007 that they would be cancelling the show in autumn after a run of nine years and replacing it for a 12-month period with commissions made by two independent production companies. On 2 September 2007, Heaven & Earth had its final show; The Proclaimers and Beth Neilsen Chapman were the final musical guests.

Notable guests
Over the years many guests appeared on the programme, including:
Dolly Parton – US country music singer/songwriter
Ray Charles – US blues musician/songwriter/performer
Barry White – US soul/pop singer 
William Shatner – Canadian actor (Star Trek)
Vanessa Feltz – British TV and radio presenter
Kevin Costner – US movie star
Cliff Richard – British pop singer
Michael Ball – British singer
Vic Reeves – British comedian
Matthew Kelly – British TV presenter
Lionel Richie – US musician
Liza Minnelli – US stage and movie star
Noel Edmonds – British TV presenter
Tony Robinson – British actor and presenter
John Barrowman – British actor (Doctor Who, Torchwood)
Tom Baker – British actor (The Doctor in Doctor Who)
Myleene Klass – British musician and TV presenter
Henry Olonga – Zimbabwean cricketer
Morgan Freeman – US actor
Pierce Brosnan – Irish actor (James Bond)
Dennis Hopper – US actor
Mike Oldfield – Musician
Nerina Pallot – British singer
Gary Numan – British singer and musician
Jim Jefferies – Australian comedian
Ed Byrne – Irish comedian
Anja Steinbauer – Philosopher
John Lydon – Sex Pistols front man.
Joan Sims – English actress (in one of her final interviews)

See also
Sunday Life, replacement TV show

References

External links
 

1998 British television series debuts
2007 British television series endings
BBC Television shows
British religious television series